Live at the Blue Note is the name of several jazz albums, including:

 Live at the Blue Note (Franco Ambrosetti album)
 Live at the Blue Note (Michel Camilo album)
 Live at the Blue Note (Chick Corea album)
 Live at the Blue Note (Duke Ellington album)
 Live at the Blue Note (Oscar Peterson album)
 Live at the Blue Note (Paquito D'Rivera Quintet album)
 Live at the Blue Note (Dave Valentin album)
 Live at the Blue Note, by Stéphane Grappelli
 Live at the Blue Note, by Irvin Mayfield
 Live at the Blue Note, by Arturo Sandoval

See also
Blue Note Jazz Club